Spondyloepimetaphyseal dysplasia is a genetic condition affecting the bones.

Types include:
 Spondyloepimetaphyseal dysplasia, Strudwick type
 Spondyloepiphyseal dysplasia congenita
 Spondyloepimetaphyseal dysplasia, Pakistani type

References

External links 

Congenital disorders